Michał Kapliński (born February 7, 1984), better known by his stage name Małolat, is a Polish rapper. Małolat has a brother who is also a rapper, better known as Pezet.

In 1998 he won the Super MC contest, in which the main prize was an appearance on the collaborative album Hip-hopowy raport z osiedla w najlepszym wydaniu. The album featured the song "Miłość braterska", which Małolat recorded with the group Płomień 81 (which his brother was a member of). Małolat later also appeared on the first two discs of Płomień 81, and also on both parts of the album Kompilacja by O$ka. In 2003 Małolat began recording a joint album with Ajron. The album was released in early 2005 and was titled W pogoni za lepszej jakości życiem.

Discography

References

1984 births
Living people
Rappers from Warsaw